Digama ostentata is a moth of the  family Erebidae. It is found in Africa, and is most commonly seen in Botswana, Mozambique, Namibia, South Africa, and Zimbabwe.

References

External links
 Species info

Endemic moths of South Africa
Aganainae
Moths described in 1899